Alonso de Arce y Soria (1654 - 1714) was a Spanish army's officer and politician, who served during the Viceroyalty of Peru as governor of Buenos Aires.

Biography 

He was born in Cañete, Cuenca, Spain, the son of José de Arce and María López de Soria, belonging to a noble Castilian family. He performed his military career in the Reales Ejércitos, serving for more than forty years in Flanders. He arrived in Buenos Aires in 1712 from Madrid, where he had purchased the title of Governor and Captain general of the Río de la Plata provinces.

He died on October 2, 1714, being replaced by Sergeant Major José Bermúdez de Castro.

His son Alonso Arce Arcos, was married to María Báez de Alpoim, daughter of Juan Báez de Alpoim and Sabina Lavayén, belonging to a distinguished family of Buenos Aires. 
His granddaughter María Bartolina de Arce, was married to Agustín Fernando de Pinedo, governor of Paraguay between 1772 and 1778.

References 

Spanish colonial governors and administrators
17th-century Spanish nobility
Governors of the Río de la Plata
Spanish captain generals
1654 births
1714 deaths
People from Buenos Aires
People from Cuenca, Spain
Río de la Plata
18th-century Spanish nobility